MX2 is a protein.

MX2 may also refer to:
 MX2 (aircraft), a carbon fiber two-seat tandem sport aircraft produced by MX Aircraft of North Carolina
 MX2 class in the Motocross World Championship
 MasterCook file extension
 Meizu MX2, a smartphone from Meizu